Arabaçı (also, Arabachy) is a village and municipality in the Gadabay District of Azerbaijan. It has a population of 1,124. The municipality consists of the villages of Arabachy and Farzaly.

References 

Populated places in Gadabay District